Gogo is a town in north-eastern Ivory Coast. It is a sub-prefecture of Téhini Department in Bounkani Region, Zanzan District.

Gogo was a commune until March 2012, when it became one of 1126 communes nationwide that were abolished.

In 2014, the population of the sub-prefecture of Gogo was 11,535.

Villages
The forty-six villages of the sub-prefecture of Gogo and their population in 2014 are:

Notes

Sub-prefectures of Bounkani
Former communes of Ivory Coast